The 1912–13 Maltese First Division was the third edition Maltese First Division. Originally contested by eight teams, Valletta United were disqualified and their results expunged. With each team playing a match against the other, Floriana ended the season winning their third consecutive title.

League table

Results

See also 
 1912 in association football
 1913 in association football

1912-13
1912–13 in European association football leagues
1912 in Malta
1913 in Malta